79th Street Station can refer to:

79th Street (IRT Broadway – Seventh Avenue Line) in Manhattan, New York City, served by the  trains
79th Street (BMT West End Line) in Brooklyn, New York City, served by the  train
 in Chicago
79th Street (Chatham) (Metra) in Chicago
Cheltenham (79th Street) (Metra) in Chicago
East 79th (RTA Red Line Rapid Transit station) in Cleveland
East 79th (RTA Blue and Green Line Rapid Transit station) in Cleveland

See also
 79th Street (disambiguation)